Nijinsky Stakes may refer to the following horse races, named after race horse Nijinsky:

Nijinsky Stakes (Canada)
Nijinsky Stakes (Ireland) (known as King George V Cup between 2013 and 2019)
Derrinstown Stud Derby Trial (known as Nijinsky Stakes between 1971 and 1983)